Muolhoi is a locality in Haflong Town, of the state of Assam in India. With a resident population 6500+, .
The population of Muolhoi strongly reflects the different communities of the ethnic Hmar people.

Brief history

The name Muolhoi was given by the predecessors translated it means "a pleasant hill lock" . It also owes its name to the Litchi fruit, which is called Muolhoi in the Hmar language

Residents
The majority of the population are Hmar.

Religion
The majority of the inhabitants are Protestant Christians, about 99% of the total population, and other religion residing there are Muslim and Hindu.

Education

Muolhoi literacy rate is 90% which greatly reflects the literacy rate of Haflong.
Various educational institutes such as Partnership Mission Society,
Muolhoi High School, Narzareth Model High School, Elarzet School and various lower primary schools and elementary schools may be found in the vicinity Partnership Mission Society.

Other places

Orphanage

Muolhoi houses the only orphanage in Dima Hasao viz. Neplai Christian Home

Climate

References

Geography of Assam